Gianni Vermeersch (born 19 November 1992) is a Belgian professional cyclist, who rides for UCI ProTeam  in road racing, cyclo-cross and gravel bike (cross country). In his first UCI World Cup race in Valkenburg, he finished in 10th place. Gianni Vermeersch became the first winner of the UCI Gravel World Championships in 2022, in Veneto (Italy).

Major results

Cyclo-cross

2011–2012
 2nd National Under-23 Championships
2012–2013
 2nd National Under-23 Championships
 3rd  UEC European Under-23 Championships
2014–2015
 2nd Versluys
 UCI World Cup
3rd Hoogerheide
 3rd Maldegem
2016–2017
 2nd Iowa City
 Brico Cross
3rd Versluys
2017–2018
 1st Iowa City
2018–2019
 Toi Toi Cup
2nd Unicov
2nd Mlada Boleslav
 Brico Cross
2nd Essen
 2nd Gullegem
 2nd Ardooie
 Superprestige
3rd Boom
2019–2020
 1st Ardooie
 1st Iowa City
 Ethias Cross
3rd Bredene
 3rd Otegem

Gravel
2022
 1st  UCI World Championships
 3rd Serenissima Gravel

Road

2015
 3rd Circuit de Wallonie
 3rd Omloop Het Nieuwsblad Beloften
2016
 2nd Omloop Het Nieuwsblad Beloften
 9th Grand Prix Pino Cerami
 9th Grand Prix de la ville de Pérenchies
 10th Grote Prijs Jef Scherens
2017
 1st Slag om Norg
 3rd Ronde van Limburg
2018
 3rd Dwars door het Hageland
2019
 1st Prologue (TTT) Tour Alsace
 2nd Druivenkoers Overijse
 5th Grote Prijs Jef Scherens
 9th Dwars door het Hageland
2020
 1st Antwerp Port Epic
 3rd Dwars door het Hageland
 4th Overall Tour of Antalya
 6th Druivenkoers Overijse
 8th Le Samyn
2021
 3rd Grote Prijs Jef Scherens
 4th Tour de Vendée
 5th Grand Prix de Wallonie
 6th Paris–Camembert
 6th Druivenkoers Overijse
 7th Tour of Flanders
 9th E3 Saxo Bank Classic
 10th Gent–Wevelgem
2022
 1st Stage 5 Four Days of Dunkirk
 2nd Antwerp Port Epic
 2nd Dwars door het Hageland

Grand Tour general classification results timeline

Classics results timeline

Major championships timeline

References

External links

1992 births
Living people
Belgian male cyclists
Cyclo-cross cyclists
People from Roeselare
Cyclists from West Flanders
UCI Gravel World Champions (men)